The women's individual normal hill ski jumping event at the FIS Nordic World Ski Championships 2013 was held on 22 February 2013.

Results
The final was started at 16:00.

References

FIS Nordic World Ski Championships 2013
2013 in Italian women's sport